Amir Ružnić (born 30 October 1972) is a Slovenian sports agent and former football player, who played as a midfielder and was capped once for the Slovenia national football team.

Playing career
During most of his playing career Ružnić played in the Slovenian PrvaLiga and has made a total of 179 league appearances for five different clubs; Izola, Maribor, Primorje, Koper, and Domžale (13).

Football Agent
After his career as a footballer, Ružnić became a football agent with his clients including; Josip Iličić, Jasmin Kurtić, Armin Bačinović, Dalibor Volaš, Aleksander Rajčević, Robert Berić, Aleš Mertelj, Aljaž Struna, Siniša Anđelković, Luka Krajnc, Elvis Bratanović, Anej Lovrečič, Jasmin Handanovič, Agim Ibraimi, Žan Benedičič and Anton Žlogar.

He is also the agent of manager Darko Milanič.

References

1972 births
Living people
Association football agents
Slovenian footballers
Slovenia international footballers
Slovenian expatriate footballers
Association football midfielders
Slovenian PrvaLiga players
Serie B players
NK Maribor players
FC Koper players
NK Domžale players
Delfino Pescara 1936 players
Expatriate footballers in Italy
Slovenian expatriate sportspeople in Italy
Place of birth missing (living people)